Martha Wright may refer to:

 Martha Wright (actress) (1926–2016), American Broadway and television actress and singer
 Martha Coffin Wright (1806–1875), American feminist, abolitionist, and signatory of the Declaration of Sentiments